Chondroitin sulfate proteoglycan 4, also known as melanoma-associated chondroitin sulfate proteoglycan (MCSP) or neuron-glial antigen 2 (NG2), is a chondroitin sulfate proteoglycan that in humans is encoded by the CSPG4 gene.

Function 
CSPG4 plays a role in stabilizing cell-substratum interactions during early events of melanoma cell spreading on endothelial basement membranes. It represents an integral membrane chondroitin sulfate proteoglycan expressed by human malignant melanoma cells.

Implications in disease 
CSPG4/NG2 is also a hallmark protein of oligodendrocyte progenitor cells (OPCs) and OPC dysfunction has been implicated as a candidate pathophysiological mechanism of familial schizophrenia. A research group investigating the role of genetics in schizophrenia, reported, two rare missense mutations in CSPG4 gene, segregating within families (CSPG4A131T and CSPG4V901G mutations). The researchers also demonstrate that the induced pluripotent stem cells (iPSCs)-derived OPCs from CSPG4A131T mutation carriers exhibited abnormal post-translational processing, subcellular localization of the mutant NG2 protein, aberrant cellular morphology, and a decreased cell viability and myelination potential. In vivo diffusion tensor imaging of the brain of CSPG4A131T mutation carriers demonstrated a reduced white matter integrity compared to the unaffected sibling and matched general population controls.

See also 
 NG2-glia

References

Further reading

External links